Sayal is a Gaupalika in Doti District in the Sudurpashchim Province of far-western Nepal.  Sayal has a population of 19551.The land area is 122.72 km2. It was formed by merging Chapali, Toleni and Khatiwada VDCs.

References

Rural municipalities in Doti District
Rural municipalities of Nepal established in 2017